John Dancey or Dauncy was an English author and translator.

Identity 
Dauncey is usually described as 'Gent.' on his title-pages. John Dancer is often erroneously credited with his publications.

Works 
Dauncey wrote a history of Charles II from the death of his father, 1660, dedicated to the Marquis of Dorchester; a life of Queen Henrietta Maria, 1660; and A Compendious Chronicle of the Kingdom of Portugal, 1661. He translated Péréfixe's Histoire de Henri le Grand in 1663, and published in the same year a broad-sheet in verse, entitled Work for Cooper, an attack on a Presbyterian pamphleteer.

References

Citations

Bibliography 

  
 Langbaine, Gerard (1691). "John DANCER, alias DAUNCY". In An Account of the English Dramatick Poets. Oxford: Printed by L.L. for George West and Henry Clements.
 Wright, Stephen (2004). "Dauncey, John (fl. 1660–1663), author and translator". In Oxford Dictionary of National Biography. Oxford University Press.

External links 

 Ockerbloom, John Mark, ed. "Dauncey, John, fl. 1663". The Online Books Page. Retrieved 10 April 2022.

17th-century English writers
English translators